Bozoklu Mustafa Pasha (1638 – December 1698) was an Ottoman statesman who served as grand vizier from 1693 to 1694. His epithet Bozoklu means "from Bozok" (modern Yozgat, Turkey).

Early life 
Mustafa was a bureaucrat in the Ottoman Empire. He was appointed as the Kapudan Pasha (grand admiral) and then as the commander of the Polish front during the Great Turkish War. In collaboration with the Crimean khan Selim I Giray, he was able to defend Kamianets-Podilskyi, an important fort (now in Ukraine) from Polish attacks. In 1690, he was appointed as the governor of Damascus (now in Syria) and Tripoli (now in Lebanon). On 27 March 1693, he succeeded Çalık Ali Pasha as the grand vizier.

As a grand vizier 
Transylvania (a region corresponding to modern-day western Romania) was then under Austrian occupation, and in the summer of 1693, Mustafa Pasha campaigned to take it for the Ottomans. However, Austrians sieged Belgrad (now in Serbia) south of his campaign course and Mustafa Pasha changed his course to defend Belgrad. Austrians had to lift the siege. Mustafa Pasha repaired the fort and returned to Istanbul, the capital. However, being close to the front, Austrians were ready to renew their attacks. Mustafa Pasha, however, was quite unconcerned for the coming Austrian attacks. He was more concerned with hunting than preparing for the next campaign. Sultan Ahmed II dismissed him on 13 March 1694 after a year in the office.

Death 
Mustafa Pasha's next post was his former post, the governorship of Tripoli. In May 1698, he was called to Istanbul to be the acting grand vizier during the then-grand vizier's presence at the battle front. Shortly thereafter, however, Mustafa Pasha died in December 1698.

See also
 List of Ottoman Grand Viziers

References

17th-century Grand Viziers of the Ottoman Empire
1698 deaths
Pashas
Ottoman Empire admirals
Ottoman governors of Damascus
Year of birth unknown
Kapudan Pashas
1638 births